John D. Richardson Dry Goods Company, also known as the American Electric Company, is a historic commercial building located at St. Joseph, Missouri. It was designed by architect Edmond Jacques Eckel (1845–1934) and built in 1892.  It is a seven-story, Richardsonian Romanesque style brick and stone building.  It measures 196 feet by 136 feet.  It features terra cotta faced facades on Jules and Third Street that are detailed with Renaissance derivation motifs.

It was listed on the National Register of Historic Places in 1982.  It is located in the Central-North Commercial Historic District.

References

Individually listed contributing properties to historic districts on the National Register in Missouri
Commercial buildings on the National Register of Historic Places in Missouri
Richardsonian Romanesque architecture in Missouri
Commercial buildings completed in 1892
Buildings and structures in St. Joseph, Missouri
National Register of Historic Places in Buchanan County, Missouri